Newtonia erlangeri is a species of plant in the family Fabaceae. It is found in Kenya, Somalia, and Tanzania.

References

erlangeri
Flora of Kenya
Flora of Somalia
Flora of Tanzania
Near threatened plants
Taxonomy articles created by Polbot